The Ontario federal electoral districts each elect one representative to the House of Commons. These districts are 
defined by Elections Canada. Their boundaries are also used for provincial electoral districts, with exceptions in Northern Ontario.

Current electoral districts
The following electoral districts are currently represented in the House of Commons.

Notes

 Electoral districts and members per Elections Canada for 2015, 2017 and 2018.
 Populations are from the 2011 Census except where noted.

References

Electoral districts, federal
Ontario